Kahraman (Hero) is the fourth studio album by Turkish-Belgian singer Hadise. It was released on June 19, 2009 and features the 2009 Eurovision song for Turkey, "Düm Tek Tek".

Singles
 "Düm Tek Tek" was the lead single from Hadise's third album "Fast Life". It was released to Turkey on April 3, 2009, as an EP. The single was the Turkish entry for the Eurovision Song Contest 2009, and came fourth in the contest.
 "Evlenmeliyiz" ("We Should Get Married") is the official second single. It was released on 6 July, 2009.

Track listing

1. Turkish Version of "On Top", featured on the album "Fast Life"
2. Turkish Version of "Hero", featured on the album "Fast Life"

Release history

References

2009 albums
Hadise albums

ro:Kahraman